MT Frankopan is one of several crude oil tankers in the fleet of Tankerska Plovidba, a shipping company based in Zadar, Croatia. It is named after Fran Krsto Frankopan, a Croatian nobleman of the Frankopan family, a noted poet and politician in the 17th century. It currently operates in the Mediterranean sea.

References
 Tankerska Plovidba dd

Oil tankers
Ships of Croatia
1995 ships
Economy of Zadar